Federal College of Education, Kano is a college of art and Sciences based in Kano State. It was established by the Northern Region Government of Nigeria in collaboration with United States Agency for International Development (USAID) in 1965 as Advance Training College Kano.

History 
In the year 1990 the Federal Government of Nigeria took over the college and renamed the college to Federal Government College (FCE)

in September 2014 Boko Haram Attacked the college, so many lost their life including the Students and the staff of the college

Schools
The institution offers part-time and full time studies in various departments under the following Schools;
 School of Art and Social Sciences
 School of Education
 School of Languages
 School of Sciences
 School of Vocational Education
 School of Early Childhood & ECCE

References 

1961 establishments in Nigeria
Educational institutions established in 1961
Universities and colleges in Kano State
Education in Kano
Buildings and structures in Kano
Federal colleges of education in Nigeria